"This Way" is a single by American Hip-hop group Dilated Peoples from their fourth studio album Neighborhood Watch (2004). The song was featured in a marketing campaign for the Volvo S40. Both the commercial and music video were directed by Dave Meyers.

Track listing
CD single/Digital download (UK) 
"This Way" - 3:54
"Poisonous" - 3:39

Promo CD" single (US and Europe)
A-side
"This Way" (Radio Version) - 3:54
"This Way" (Instrumental) - 3:54
B-side
"This Way" (A Cappella) - 3:54 (EU), 3:56 (US)

12" single (UK)
A-side
"This Way" (Radio Version) - 3:54
B-side
"This Way" (Instrumental) - 3:54
"This Way" (A Cappella) - 3:56

Promo 12" single (US and Europe)
"This Way" (Radio Version) - 3:54
"This Way" (Instrumental) - 3:54
"This Way" (A Cappella) - 3:56

Commercial performance
The song debuted at its peak of number 78 on the US Billboard Hot 100. It did the same on the UK Singles Chart at a higher position of number 35.

Charts

References

2004 songs
2004 singles
Kanye West songs
Songs written by Kanye West
Song recordings produced by Kanye West
Capitol Records singles
Parlophone singles

Music videos directed by Dave Meyers (director)